"Wanted Man" is a song written by Bob Dylan for Johnny Cash.

Cash first released it on his 1969 live album At San Quentin, recorded at San Quentin State Prison.

The song has been covered by many artists, including George Thorogood & The Destroyers (1982) and Nick Cave and the Bad Seeds (1985).

In 2019, Bob Dylan's archivists released a demo version of this song, sung in a duet by him and Cash, with Carl Perkins accompanying them on guitar.

Content
The song is about a fugitive who requests listeners not to blow the whistle on him, should he be spotted. The fugitive mentions several cities and states where he is wanted, as well as other unmentioned locations and several women from his past who seek to turn him in.

References 

1969 songs
Songs written by Bob Dylan
Johnny Cash songs
Bob Dylan songs